Henry Lamin Massaquoi (born September 19, 1978 in Bo, Sierra Leone) is a Sierra Leonean international footballer. He is a member of the Leone Stars, Sierra Leone national football team.

External links
http://nationalfootballteamsafrica.741.com/Sierraleone.htm

1978 births
Living people
Sierra Leonean footballers
People from Bo, Sierra Leone
Association football midfielders
Sierra Leone international footballers